Niels Petersen (12 February 1918 – 22 August 1966) was a Danish weightlifter. He competed in the men's heavyweight event at the 1948 Summer Olympics.

References

External links
 

1918 births
1966 deaths
Danish male weightlifters
Olympic weightlifters of Denmark
Weightlifters at the 1948 Summer Olympics
People from Kerteminde
World Weightlifting Championships medalists
Sportspeople from the Region of Southern Denmark